Setarches is a genus of deep-sea bristly scorpionfishes.

Species
There are currently two recognized species in this genus:

 Setarches guentheri J. Y. Johnson, 1862 (Channelled rockfish)
 Setarches longimanus (Alcock, 1894) (Red deepwater scorpionfish)

References

Setarchinae
Taxa named by James Yate Johnson
Marine fish genera